The 1994 Arena Football League season was the eighth season of the Arena Football League (AFL). The league champions were the Arizona Rattlers, who defeated the Orlando Predators in ArenaBowl VIII.

Team movement
Three expansion teams joined the league: the Fort Worth Cavalry, Las Vegas Sting, and the Milwaukee Mustangs.

Meanwhile, the Cincinnati Rockers and the Dallas Texans folded and the Detroit Drive relocated to Massachusetts to become the Massachusetts Marauders. The Denver Dynamite remained inactive.

Standings

Playoffs

All-Arena team

References